László Csávás (born 19 September 1934) is a Hungarian ski jumper. He competed in the normal hill and large hill events at the 1964 Winter Olympics.

References

1934 births
Living people
Hungarian male ski jumpers
Olympic ski jumpers of Hungary
Ski jumpers at the 1964 Winter Olympics
Skiers from Budapest